The 1905 Princeton Tigers football team represented Princeton University in the 1905 college football season. The team finished with an 8–2 record under third-year head coach Art Hillebrand and outscored its opponents by a total of 229 to 45. Princeton fullback Jim McCormick was selected as a consensus first-team honoree on the 1905 College Football All-America Team. Tackle James Cooney was also selected as a first-team All-American by The New York Times.

Schedule

References

Princeton
Princeton Tigers football seasons
Princeton Tigers football